The  is an electric multiple unit (EMU) train type operated by the private railway operator Tokyu Corporation on the Ikegami and Tamagawa lines in Japan since December 2007.

Design
Based on the 5000 series design, cars are 18 metres long and have three sets of doors per side.

These trains use a Train Automatic Stopping Controller (TASC) system allowing them to stop automatically at all stations.

Formation
, the fleet consists of 15 three-car sets, 7101F to 7115F, formed as follows.

Car 2 is fitted with two single-arm pantographs.

Key 
 CP: Compressor
 VVVF: Variable-frequency drive
 SIV: Static inverter

Interior
Seating is predominantly arranged longitudinally, with some transverse seating bays in the centre car.

History

The first two three-car sets were delivered in November 2007.

Two sets, 7108 and 7109, were delivered from the J-TREC factory in Yokohama in November 2017.

Six additional sets, numbered 7110 to 7115, were delivered from the J-TREC factory in Yokohama in 2018.

Special liveries 
From 10 April 2022, two 7000 series sets are due to receive a special livery to commemorate the 100th anniversary of Tokyu Corporation's founding.

References

External links

 Tokyu EMU details 
 Tokyu 7000 series (Japan Railfan Magazine) 

Electric multiple units of Japan
7000 series
Train-related introductions in 2007
1500 V DC multiple units of Japan
Tokyu Car multiple units
J-TREC multiple units